Elections New Brunswick is the non-partisan agency of the legislative assembly in New Brunswick charged with running provincial elections, municipal elections, district education council and regional health authority elections. The Chief Electoral Officer oversees the electoral process and reports to the New Brunswick legislature. The Chief Electoral Officer is not permitted to vote in elections during his or her term.

Elections New Brunswick reports annually to the legislative assembly and is charged with implementing the Election Act (1973), Municipal Elections Act (1979), and the Political Process Financing Act (1978).

List of Chief Electoral Officers
Kimberly A. Poffenroth (2017–present)
Michael P. Quinn (2007–2017)
Annise Hollies (2000–2007)
Barbara J. Landry (1991–2000)
Henry G. Irwin (1991)
Scovil S. Hoyt (1989–1991)
Luc LeBrun (1984–1987)
Lloyd H. Nickerson (1972–1984)
Donald Whalen (1967–1972)

See also
 List of political parties in New Brunswick

References

External links
Elections New Brunswick

New Brunswick
Politics of New Brunswick
1967 establishments in New Brunswick